Springfield Big Four Depot was a Springfield, Ohio passenger train station of the Cleveland, Cincinnati, Chicago and St. Louis Railway, commonly referred to as the 'Big Four Railroad.' Construction on the station began on November 22, 1909 and it opened for service in 1911, The brick structure was located at 202 Washington Street and Spring Street, east of the Big Four's previous station on the south side of Washington Street.

The New York Central Railroad in 1906 had acquired the Big Four. However, the Big Four operated as a separate entity until 1930 when the Big Four was fully absorbed into New York Central operations. Many politicians, such as Richard Nixon in his 1968 presidential campaign, used the station as a place for campaign stops.

Passenger trains

In 1924 an average of 3,000 freight cars and 40 passenger and express trains passed through the depot each day. By 1926 the station was accommodating 26 passenger trains a day. Two years later, the depot was being used by 123,000 passengers. 

In 1947, in the postwar period, the station remained busy with New York Central trains bound in multiple directions:

Cincinnati - Columbus - Cleveland route: 
Cleveland Special, Midnight Special, New York Special (section connecting with main part of the New York-bound train in Cleveland), Ohio State Limited (bound for New York after Cleveland), Water Level Route (section connecting with main part of the New York-bound train in Cleveland), plus a six day a week unnamed train and two daily unnamed trains on the same route

Cincinnati - Toledo - Detroit route:
Michigan Special and a New York Central extension of the Ponce de Leon (Florida - Cincinnati)

Indianapolis - Springfield route:
local unnamed motor train service, six days a week

Decline
The last trains on the Detroit - Cincinnati route, Michigan Special (northbound) and Ohio Special (southbound) had their final runs in 1958. In 1967 the Ohio State Limited had its final run, as did the Night Special, both on the Cincinnati-Cleveland route. The New York Central sustained a local unnamed remnant of the Ohio State Limited on the Cincinnati-Cleveland route. The Penn Central (formed from the New York Central-Pennsylvania Railroad merger) carried on this service in the final year of the station's existence.

The Big Four Depot was ultimately demolished in February 1969 to make way for the Spring Street bridge, for State Route 72's bypass.

The Penn Central reduced trains for the final months of service through Springfield to a Cincinnati - Columbus train, as a feeder to a Columbus connection with the St. Louis - New York Spirit of St. Louis The last trains through the station ran on April 30, 1971.

References

Railway stations in the United States opened in 1911
Former New York Central Railroad stations
Former railway stations in Ohio
Buildings and structures in Springfield, Ohio